Love Is Me, Love Is You is a song written by Tony Hatch and Jackie Trent and first recorded by Connie Francis.

Due to Petula Clark having reached #1 on the Billboard Hot 100 in January 1965 with "Downtown" and being afforded a smash follow-up with "I Know a Place", Connie Francis was eager to work with Clark's main composer and producer Tony Hatch. They met on 26 May 1965 at Philips Studios Stanhope Place in London for a three-song session which yielded a cover version of Connie Smith's 1964 C&W classic "Once a Day", the ballad "Roundabout" (previously recorded by Petula Clark but then unreleased) and the beat number "Love Is Me, Love Is You". The session notes indicate two versions of "Love Is Me, Love Is You", referred to as "US version" and "UK version". Both versions share a very similar orchestral arrangement with only slight differences, but make distinct use of the background vocalists on the song's refrain, the US version featuring the background vocalists singing "doo-wop" behind Francis' vocal while on the UK version the background vocalists sing-along with Francis.

"Love Is Me, Love Is You" had its original single release serving as B-side to "Roundabout" in that track's UK single release of 3 September 1965. In the US – where "Roundabout" had been released with the B-side "Bossa Nova Hand Dance" – "Love Is Me, Love Is You" was given an A-side single release in February 1966 to rise to a Billboard Hot 100 peak of #66. In the UK Francis' "Love Is Me, Love Is You" was given an A-side release in March 1966, two other versions of the song being issued as UK singles that month, the first by Truly Smith (11 March 1966) with a rendition by co-writer Jackie Trent – produced by Tony Hatch – being released 18 March 1966: none of the three versions would reach the UK Top 50. In Canada, Francis' "Love Is Me, Love Is You" would chart with a #61 peak: in Australia the track would afford Francis her final major hit in that territory with a #31 peak. The Connie Francis single release with  "Love Is Me, Love Is You" as A-side featured as B-side the track "I'd Let You Break My Heart All Over Again" which Francis had recorded 10 July 1959.

In March 1966 Francis recorded a number of non-English renderings of "Love Is Me, Love Is You":

Despite being largely overlooked in its original English-language version, "Love Is Me, Love Is You" was recorded in non-English renderings by a number of vocalists:

References 
 Feddersen, Jan: Connie Francis, companion book to 5 CD retrospective "Lass mir die bunten Träume", Bear Family Records BCD 15 786 EI, Hambergen 1994
 Francis, Connie and others: Souvenirs, companion book to 4 CD retrospective "Souvenirs", Polydor (New York) 1995, Kat.-Nr. 314 533 382-2
 Roberts, Ron: Connie Francis Discography 1955–1975, revised editions 1979 und 1983
 Weize, Richard: Connie Francis, companion book to 8 LP retrospective "Connie Francis in Deutschland", Bear Family Records BFX 15 305, Hambergen/Vollersode 1988
 Connie Francis discography (Fan Project)

Connie Francis songs
1966 songs
Songs written by Tony Hatch
Songs written by Jackie Trent